The mayor of Santa Maria is the highest decision-maker and chief executive of the municipality of Santa Maria, Bulacan, Philippines. He leads the enforcement of municipal ordinances and improvement of public services. The mayor has a term of office of three years, but has a maximum electoral tenure of three consecutive terms. Inaugural holder of the office was Maximo Evidente (1899-1900).

The present 1987 Constitution of the Philippines defined the position, powers and responsibilities of the mayor as well as the municipal charter.

Town of Santa Maria (1793-Present) 

There were 82 capitanes who served the Spanish colonial administration from 1793 to 1899; 12 Presidentes from 1899 to 1937; 4 Alcaldes from 1938 to 1947 and 11 Mayors under various terms and succession from 1947 to present.

Spanish Era (1793-1899)

1899-Present

Presidentes

Alcaldes

Mayors

References

Santa Maria, Bulacan
Santa Maria, Bulacan